The Roman Catholic Diocese of San Pedro-en-Côte d'Ivoire is a diocese located in the city of San Pedro in the Ecclesiastical province of Gagnoa in Côte d'Ivoire.

History
 October 23, 1989: Established as Diocese of San Pedro-en-Côte-d’Ivoire from Diocese of Gagnoa

Special churches
The Cathedral is the Cathédrale St. Pierre in San Pedro.

Leadership
 Bishops of San Pedro-en-Côte d'Ivoire (Roman rite)
 Bishop Barthélémy Djabla (1989.10.23 – 2006.07.21), appointed Archbishop of Gagnoa
 Bishop Paulin Kouabénan N'Gnamé (2007.03.01 – 2008.03.21)
 Bishop Jean-Jacques Koffi Oi Koffi (since 2009.01.03)

See also
Roman Catholicism in Côte d'Ivoire
List of Roman Catholic dioceses in Côte d'Ivoire

Sources
 GCatholic.org
 Catholic Hierarchy

Roman Catholic dioceses in Ivory Coast
Christian organizations established in 1989
Roman Catholic dioceses and prelatures established in the 20th century
Bas-Sassandra District
San-Pédro, Ivory Coast
1989 establishments in Ivory Coast
Roman Catholic Ecclesiastical Province of Gagnoa